Nana Lee (born January 29, 1985) is an Indonesian singer, songwriter, musician, saxophonist and actress. She is best known for taking part in Super Idol Taiwan.

Career
Born in Jakarta, Nana became interested in music and acting at an early age. She performed in amateur theatre productions and landed minor roles on various television shows during her high school years. Her singing career started in 2003. In a November 2009 interview, Nana indicated her music is primary influenced by Jazz, Pop, R&B and Chinese songs. She performs regularly at festivals and jazz clubs and on national TV in Indonesia and Taiwan.

In 2009, Nana released her debut album Be+Positive and followed it a year later with Women in love in cooperation with famed music arranger Idang Rasjidi. In 2011, she launched her third album, Tribute to Koes Plus in Bossanova, which outperformed the success of its predecessors. Nana received nationwide publicity by taking part in the 2013 Super Idol Taiwan. In 2014, she released the indie album Positivity.

Nana made her debut in Europe in January 2014. She represented Indonesia at the Indonesian Night of the World Economic Forum at its annual meeting in Davos, Switzerland. In the same year, she wrote and recorded Go Indonesia, which is used by Indonesia's first English TV channel The Indonesia Channel (TIC) as its theme song.

Discography
Be+Positive (2009) 
Women in love (2010)
Tribute to Koes Plus in Bossanova (2011)
Positivity (2014)

Awards and accomplishments
 2012 Best Performance Act award at Let Taiwan see the World festival
 2013 Winner of Face Off in Super Idol Taiwan representing Indonesia

References

External links
Interview with X Top Model Search Malaysia
Performance at Super Idol
Interview in talkshow Talk Indonesia
Interview with ME Asia Magazine
Official website of Nana Lee

1985 births
Living people
Indonesian people of Chinese descent
21st-century Indonesian women singers
Singers from Jakarta
Indonesian songwriters